FM 101 is a commercial FM radio station owned by Pakistan Broadcasting Corporation. It is broadcast from Karachi, Hyderabad, Lahore, Islamabad and around 10 cities of Pakistan.

History
On 1 October 1998, Radio Pakistan started FM transmission simultaneously from Islamabad, Karachi and Lahore under the title of FM 101, exclusively for entertainment. It mainly broadcasts free-to-air content.

Network
FM 101 is a network of 18 FM stations is spread around 9 cities of Pakistan list of the cities are given below.
 Islamabad
 Lahore
 Multan
 Karachi
 Quetta
 Faisalabad
 Hyderabad
 Sialkot
 Peshawar
 Sargodha
 Abbottabad

Satellite
FM 101's transmission is available on Asiasat 3.

Internet
FM 101's transmission is also available on the web.

See also
 List of Pakistani radio channels
 Radio Pakistan
 List of FM radio stations in Pakistan
 List of radio stations in Asia
 Mast FM
 Hum FM

References

External links

Radio Pakistan

Radio stations in Pakistan
1998 establishments in Pakistan